Alfred Loewy (20 June 1873 – 25 January 1935) was a German mathematician who worked on representation theory. Loewy rings, Loewy length, Loewy decomposition and Loewy series are named after him.

His graduate students included Wolfgang Krull and Friedrich Karl Schmidt.

Books
Versicherungsmathematik, 1903
Lehrbuch der Algebra, 1915
Grundlagen der Arithmetik 1915
Mathematik des Geld- und Zahlungsverkehrs, 1920

Notes

References

 Volker R. Remmert: Zur Mathematikgeschichte in Freiburg. Alfred Loewy (1873-1935): Jähes Ende späten Glanzes, in: Freiburger Universitätsblätter 129(1995), 81-102

20th-century German mathematicians
1873 births
1935 deaths
People from Rawicz
People from the Province of Posen